Kim Un-hyang (born 18 October 1990) is a North Korean artistic gymnast. She was the balance beam gold medalist at the 2014 Asian Games. At the 2009 World Championships, she finished fourth in the balance beam final.  She also competed at the 2014 World Championships.

References 

1990 births
Living people
North Korean female artistic gymnasts
Asian Games medalists in gymnastics
Gymnasts at the 2006 Asian Games
Gymnasts at the 2014 Asian Games
Asian Games gold medalists for North Korea
Asian Games silver medalists for North Korea
Medalists at the 2014 Asian Games
Universiade medalists in gymnastics
Universiade bronze medalists for North Korea
Medalists at the 2009 Summer Universiade
21st-century North Korean women